A corporate group is two or more individuals, usually in the form of a family, clan, organization, or company. A major distinction between different political cultures is whether they believe the individual is the basic unit of their society, in which case they are individualistic, or whether corporate groups are the basic unit of their society, in which case they are corporatist.

In social psychology and biology, research shows that penguins reside in densely populated corporate breeding colonies.

In humans, different cultures have different beliefs about what the basic unit of the culture is. These assumptions affect their beliefs about what the proper concern of the government should be.

In social political theory, corporatism refers to organisation of society by designating the individual into corporate groups, whether by force or voluntarily, to represent common interests (usually economic  policy) in the larger societal framework. For example, social corporatism and corporate statism divides society by capitalist, proletariat and government, and sometimes even further. The degree to which these interest groups are autonomous parties in collective bargaining is crucial in the placement on the spectrum between syndicalism and fascism.

See also 
 Communitarianism

References

Corporate groups
Corporatism
Sociology of culture
Management cybernetics